The 2019–20 season was UD Almería's twentieth ninth season of existence and the fifth consecutive in Segunda División. The season covered a period from 1 July 2019 to 16 August 2020.

Squad

Transfers

In

Total spending:  €1,000,000

Out

Total gaining:  €0

Balance
Total:  €1,000,000

Coaches

Staff members

Source: UD Almería's official website

Player statistics

Appearances and goals
Last updated on 25 July 2020.

|-
! colspan=12 style=background:#dcdcdc; text-align:center|Goalkeepers

|-
! colspan=12 style=background:#dcdcdc; text-align:center|Defenders

|-
! colspan=12 style=background:#dcdcdc; text-align:center|Midfielders

|-
! colspan=12 style=background:#dcdcdc; text-align:center|Forwards

|-
! colspan=12 style=background:#dcdcdc; text-align:center| Players on loan to other clubs

|-
! colspan=12 style=background:#dcdcdc; text-align:center| Players who left the club midway through the season

|-
|}

Top scorers

Disciplinary record

Pre-season and friendlies

Competitions

Overview

Segunda División

Results summary

Results by round

Matches
The fixtures were revealed on 4 July 2019.

Play-offs

Copa del Rey

References

Almeria
UD Almería seasons
2019–20 Segunda División